Freycinet Island is a small island in Henri Freycinet Harbour, lying off the Carrarang peninsula in the southern part of Shark Bay, on the-west coast of Western Australia.  It is an elevated limestone plateau with scree slopes, vegetated with nitre bush shrubland.

Birds
Freycinet Island is one component of the Quoin Bluff and Freycinet Island Important Bird Area (IBA), identified as such by BirdLife International because it holds an important nesting colony of pied cormorants.  Together with a similar colony on Quoin Bluff some 80 km to the north-west, it supports between 5000 and 10,000 birds - over 1% of the world population of the species. Small numbers of wedge-tailed shearwaters and silver gulls also nest on the island, and rock parrots have been recorded there.

See also
 List of islands in Shark Bay

References

Important Bird Areas of Western Australia
Islands of Shark Bay